Dajim (born Suwitcha Suphawira, January 15, 1977) is a Thai hip hop singer and rap artist.

Biography 
Before entering the music industry, Dajim worked at his father's video store and as a sales clerk at Tower Records. He later teamed up with his friend DJ Dig-it-all to produce his first album, Hip Hop Underworld and to start an underground record label, N.Y.U. Club. He began working as a DJ on Khao San Road around this time.

Dajim claims that his pseudonym was coined by his managers at Tower Records, comparing his witty nature to comedian Jim Carrey.

Controversy 
The offensive content of Dajim's songs led to his arrest in September 2001 under the controversial "social order" policies of then-Interior Minister Purachai Piumsomboon. In particular, the song Sueak Thammai (Why bother?) became something of an anthem for club DJs in protest of new early closure laws, who would blast the song when authorities came to shut them down for the night. As a result, sale of his two independently released albums was forbidden. He joined GMM Grammy's subsidiary label Genie Records in 2002 and released his third album, Rap Thai, that same year.

When his early albums began to resurface for sale at Pantip Plaza and other locations, Dajim was arrested again in April 2002, but he claimed that this distribution was done without his consent or knowledge and was either counterfeit goods or leftover stock of the banned albums.

Personal life 

Dajim is best friends with the Swedish singer-songwriter Alea Karin, they met in Bangkok in 2009. She describes him as the big brother she never had.

Although not actively releasing new material at the moment, Dajim still performs live regularly at concerts and appears in collaborative songs with other hip hop artists as a featured guest.

Discography

N.Y.U. Club 
 Hip Hop Under World (2000)
 Hip Hop Above The Law (2001)
 Independence Day (2009)

Genie records 
 Rap Thai (2002)
 Twilight Zone (2003)
 Kik Thua Thai (2005, "Girls all over Thailand")

Masscotte Entertainment 
 Peh Wer (2012, single, "On point")
 Kin Lao Mun Khom Kin Nom Dee Kua (2012, single, "Booze is bitter, better drink milk")

Independent 
 Taxi BKK (2015, single)

References 

1977 births
Living people
21st-century Thai male singers
Thai rappers